Events in the year 1982 in Germany.

Incumbents
President – Karl Carstens 
Chancellor
Helmut Schmidt (until 2 October 1982)
Helmut Kohl (from 2 October 1982)

Events
12-23 February - 32nd Berlin International Film Festival
20 March - Germany in the Eurovision Song Contest 1982: Nicole Seibert wins the contest with "Ein bißchen Frieden".
10 June - 1982 Bonn summit
19 June - 28 October - The documenta 7 art exhibition is held in Kassel.
23 September - Launch of the all-new Audi 100.
4 October - The first cabinet led by Helmut Kohl was sworn in. 
13 October - Launch of the Ford Sierra, which replaces the Ford Taunus in Germany and the rest of Continental Europe, as well as the Ford Cortina in the United Kingdom and other right-hand drive markets.
December - The Audi 100 is voted European Car of the Year, with the Ford Sierra coming in second place.
19 December - Hamburg state election, December 1982

Births 

22 January - Liane Bahler, German cyclist (died 2007)
17 March - Jan Wolfgarten, German swimmer
6 April - Alwara Höfels, German actress
16 April - Michael Ratajczak, footballer
6 July - Julius Brink, German beach volleyball player
29 July - Allison Mack, American actress and criminal
31 July - Michael Jung, German equestrian
12 September - Max Hoff, German canoeist
16 September - Barbara Engleder, German sport shooter
18 November - Gracia Baur, German singer
9 December - Bastian Swillims, German sprinter

Deaths

11 January - Bruno Diekmann, German politician (born 1897)
20 March - Bally Prell, German singer and folk singer (born 1922)
29 March
 Carl Orff, German composer (born 1895)
 Walter Hallstein, German diplomat and politician (born 1901)
9 April - Robert Havemann, German chemist (born 1910)
19 April Erwin Casmir, fencer (born 1895)
10 May - Peter Weiss, German writer (born 1916)
30 May - Albert Norden, German politician (born 1904)
2 June - Herbert Quandt, German industrialist (born 1910)
10 June - Rainer Werner Fassbinder, German film director, screenwriter, and actor (born 1945)
15 June - Hermann Schlichting, German engineer (born 1907)
18 June - Curd Jürgens, German actor (born 1915)
26 June - Alexander Mitscherlich, German psychoanalyst (born 1908)
2 July - Siegfried Westphal, German general (born 1902)
10 July - Karl Hein, German athlete (born 1908)
1 August -Otto Bayer, German chemist (born 1902)
5 August - Dieter Borsche, German actor (born 1909)
29 November - Hermann Balck, German general (born 1893)
30 November - Adolf Heusinger, German general (born 1897)

See also
1982 in German television

References

 
Years of the 20th century in Germany
1980s in Germany